Legislative elections were held in São Tomé and Príncipe on 3 March 2002.

Results

References

Elections in São Tomé and Príncipe
Sao Tome
Election
March 2002 events in Africa
Election and referendum articles with incomplete results